Hope Airport may refer to:

 Hope Airport (Alaska) in Hope, Alaska, United States (IATA: 5HO)
 Hope Aerodrome in Hope, British Columbia, Canada (IATA: YHE)
 Hope Municipal Airport in Hope, Arkansas, United States (IATA: M18)
 Bob Hope Airport in Burbank, California, United States (IATA: BUR)

id:Bandar Udara Hope
pms:Hope Airport